Mohammad Rozaimi Azwar bin Mat Noor (born 23 January 1993) is a Malaysian professional footballer. Rozaimi plays mainly as a central midfielder but can also play as an attacking midfielder.

Club career
Born and raised in Rantau Panjang located near the Malaysia-Thailand border state of Kelantan, Rozaimi began his career with Perlis U-21 in 2012. In 2013, Rozaimi joined Kelantan U-21 and was part of the team that won 2013 Malaysia President's Cup. He was selected as man of the match in the final after scoring the winning goal for his side against Perak U-21 at Sultan Muhammad IV Stadium on 12 October 2013.

After showing a good performances with the Kelantan's youth team, he was called by the head coach at that time, George Boateng to train with the first team for 2014 Malaysia Cup campaign. In 2015, Rozaimi has been promoted to the Kelantan's first team for 2015 Malaysia Super League campaign but did not make any appearances.

In May 2015, Rozaimi was loaned to Malaysia Premier League side Sabah until end of the 2015 season.

After returned from Sabah at the end of the 2015 season, Rozaimi signed one-year loan deal with Putrajaya based club, MOF FC and made his debut in 2–2 draw against KDMM on 11 May 2016. He made 6 appearances for MOF FC before returned to Kelantan at the end of the season.

On 8 April 2017, Rozaimi made his league debut for Kelantan in 1–2 defeat against Pahang in Sultan Muhammad IV Stadium.

He was released by Kelantan in April 2018.

Career statistics

Club

Honours

Club
Kelantan U21
 Malaysia President Cup: 2013

Personal life
Rozaimi had a road accident during Chinese New Year celebration in 2011 and had to rest for a year after he broke his leg. He is the youngest son from eight siblings.

References

External links
 

Living people
1993 births
People from Kelantan
Malaysian people of Malay descent
Malaysian footballers
Kelantan FA players
Sabah F.C. (Malaysia) players
MOF F.C. players
Association football midfielders